Weightlifting competitions at the 2016 Summer Olympics in Rio de Janeiro took place from 6 to 16 August at the Pavilion 2 of Riocentro. 260 athletes (156 men and 104 women) competed in 15 different events according to their respective weight categories. Bulgaria and Russia were banned from participating in the sport for systematic doping.

Events
15 sets of medals were awarded in the following events:

Competition schedule
There were at most three sessions of competition on each day of the 2016 Olympics Weightlifting program:
 Morning session: 10:00–14:00 BRT
 Afternoon session: 15:30–17:30 BRT
 Evening session: 19:00–21:00 BRT

Qualification

Similar to 2012 format, a total of 260 athletes qualified through a combination of team and individual spots. Host nation Brazil had already guaranteed three automatic places for men and two for women, while ten spots (six for men and four for women) were entitled to the athletes through the Tripartite Commission Invitation, leaving the remaining berths up for grabs in both the men's and women's competitions respectively.

Participation

Participating nations

Competitors

Medal summary

Medal table

Olympic records broken
Five Olympic records were broken.

Men's events

  Kyrgyzstan's Izzat Artykov originally won the bronze medal, but was disqualified after he tested positive for strychnine.
  On 22 March 2022, the Court of Arbitration for Sport stated that the original gold medalist Nijat Rahimov, of Kazakhstan, was disqualified due to a doping offence.
  On 8 December 2016, the Court of Arbitration for Sport stated that the original bronze medalist Gabriel Sincraian, of Romania, was disqualified after he tested positive for exogenous Testosterone.

Women's events

See also
Powerlifting at the 2016 Summer Paralympics

References

External links

 
 
 Results Book – Weightlifting

 
2016 Summer Olympics events
2016
Olympics
Olympics
Doping in Russia